Macaé Esporte Futebol Clube, commonly known as Macaé, is a Brazilian professional football club in Macaé, Rio de Janeiro. The team compete in Campeonato Carioca, the top tier of the Rio de Janeiro state football league.

History
The city's most popular team, the Macaé Esporte Futebol Clube was founded on July 17, 1990 as Botafogo Futebol Clube. For eight years, the team only participated in amateur competitions and the first titles came in the middle of the decade, when he became a double champion in the municipality of Macaé (1994 and 1995).

But it was from 1998 that the club began to show its "face" to the State of Rio, when the professionalization took place. And soon in its first season, the then Botafogo conquered the State of the Third Division. In that same year, the team finished runner-up of Copa Rio do Interior and one of the semifinalists of Copa Rio da Capital, being eliminated by Fluminense.

In 1999, already using the fancy name Macaé Sports, the club disputed the State of the Second Division and ended up getting the runner-up. In the year 2000, the club made its second statutory change and, definitively, it was renamed Macaé Esporte Futebol Clube. In 2002, alvianil was close to reaching the elite of Rio de Janeiro, but again it was runner-up in Second Division, a fact that was repeated in 2006. But it was in 2003 that the club entered the national scene, when playing for the first time the Campeonato Brasileiro Série C.

In 2009, the club had one of its best seasons of its history. Macaé was fifth in the Campeonato Carioca, behind only the four majors of the state. The campaign won a place in the Campeonato Brasileiro Série D, a competition in which the club won the runner-up.

But it was in 2014 that Macaé achieved its greatest glory in all its history. In addition to gaining access to Campeonato Brasileiro Série B the following year, he won the Campeonato Brasileiro Série C by drawing 3-3 with Paysandu.

Stadium

Macaé play its home games at Estádio Cláudio Moacyr. The stadium has a maximum capacity of 16,000 people.

Honours
 Brazilian Série C: 1
2014

Campeonato Carioca Série B1: 1
1998

Current squad

References

External links
Official Site

Macaé Esporte Futebol Clube
Association football clubs established in 1990
Macaé
1990 establishments in Brazil
Campeonato Brasileiro Série C winners